"Eight Days a Week" is a song by the English rock band the Beatles. It was written by Paul McCartney and John Lennon based on McCartney's original idea. The song was released in the United Kingdom in December 1964 on the album Beatles for Sale. In the United States, it was first issued as a single in February 1965 before appearing on the North American release Beatles VI. The song was the band's seventh number 1 single on the Billboard Hot 100, a run of US chart success achieved in just over a year. The single was also number 1 in Canada, Belgium and the Netherlands.

The Beatles recorded "Eight Days a Week" at EMI Studios in London in October 1964. The track opens with a fade-in, marking the first time that this technique had been used on a pop studio recording. The song was reissued worldwide in 2000 on the Beatles compilation album 1. It also provided the title for director Ron Howard's 2016 documentary film on the band's years as live performers, The Beatles: Eight Days a Week.

Inspiration
Paul McCartney has attributed the inspiration of the song to at least two different sources. In a 1984 interview with Playboy magazine, he credited the title to one of Ringo Starr's malapropisms, which similarly provided titles for the Lennon–McCartney songs "A Hard Day's Night" and "Tomorrow Never Knows". McCartney recalled: "He said it as though he were an overworked chauffeur: 'Eight days a week.' When we heard it, we said, 'Really? Bing! Got it!'"

McCartney subsequently credited the title to an actual chauffeur who once drove him to Lennon's house in Weybridge. In the Beatles Anthology book, he states: "I usually drove myself there, but the chauffeur drove me out that day and I said, 'How've you been?' – 'Oh working hard,' he said, 'working eight days a week.'" In a 2016 interview alongside Starr and Ron Howard, in preparation for the release of the documentary The Beatles: Eight Days a Week – The Touring Years, McCartney reiterated that he had heard it from a chauffeur who was driving him to Lennon's house while he was banned from driving. Starr has said he is not the source of the phrase.

Recording

"Eight Days a Week" was the first song that the Beatles took into the studio unfinished to work on the arrangement during the session, a practice that would become common for the band. The song was recorded on 6 October 1964 during two sessions that together lasted nearly seven hours, with a fifteen-minute break in between. The band tried out several ideas for the intro and outro of the song. The first take featured a simple acoustic guitar introduction. The second take introduced an "oo"-ing vocal that was experimented with until the sixth take, when it was abandoned in favour of a guitar intro. The final outro (along with unused intro takes) was recorded separately, on 18 October.

The completed song incorporated another Beatles' first, in that it begins with a fade-in. "Eight Days a Week" marked the first time that a fade-in had been used to open a pop song. The instrumentation on the track consists of acoustic guitar, electric guitar, drums, bass and overdubbed handclaps. The fade-in and coda both include guitar overdubs, played by George Harrison on his Rickenbacker 12-string.

Release and reception
"Eight Days a Week" was released on Beatles for Sale on 4 December 1964. It was sequenced as the opening track on side two of the LP. Describing the unusual effect provided by the fade-in, particularly at the start of an LP side, author Mark Hertsgaard writes that it gave listeners "the sensation of hearing the music before the song actually arrived; it was as if the sound arose out of the distance, like a flock of migrating birds that suddenly fills the sky."

The song, along with two others from the album ("Baby's in Black" and "No Reply"), was considered for a single release. In the end, it was released as a single in the United States on 15 February 1965 (as Capitol 5371), becoming a number-one hit (their seventh in that country).  Cash Box described it as "a hard-driving, rollicking pledge of romantic devotion with a contagious repeating rockin’ riff." The B-side was "I Don't Want to Spoil the Party". The single release in the US was the result of DJs playing the song from imported copies of the Beatles for Sale album as an exclusive since it did not appear on the album's US counterpart, Beatles '65, nor did the B-side. Both tracks were included on the North American album Beatles VI, released in June 1965.

"Eight Days a Week" was certified gold by the Recording Industry Association of America on 16 September 1965. It was the last of seven songs by the Beatles to top the Billboard Hot 100 over a one-year period, marking an all-time record for a single act. In order, the seven songs were "I Want to Hold Your Hand", "She Loves You", "Can't Buy Me Love", "Love Me Do", "A Hard Day's Night", "I Feel Fine" and "Eight Days a Week". The song was also the second of six Hot 100 chart toppers in a row (not counting the EP 4 by the Beatles) by one act, another record at the time. The other singles in this run were "I Feel Fine", "Ticket to Ride", "Help!", "Yesterday" and "We Can Work It Out".

Personnel
John Lennon – double-tracked lead vocals, acoustic rhythm guitar, handclaps
Paul McCartney – harmony vocals, bass guitar, handclaps
George Harrison – backing vocals, lead guitars, handclaps
Ringo Starr – drums, handclaps

Live performances
Although it was a huge American hit, the group did not think highly of the song (Lennon called it "lousy") and they never performed it live or at any of their radio sessions for the BBC. The only live performance was for UK television on the 3 April 1965 edition of the ITV series Thank Your Lucky Stars. No film or videotape of this  episode is available and it is considered lost.

Paul McCartney performed the song live – the first time for any Beatle – on 4 May 2013 at the Estádio Mineirão, Belo Horizonte, Brazil and sporadically throughout his 2013–2015 Out There tour.

Charts and certifications

Weekly charts

Year-end charts

Certifications

References

Notes

Bibliography

External links 

 Lyrics of this song
 
 

1964 songs
1965 singles
The Beatles songs
Capitol Records singles
Songs written by Lennon–McCartney
Song recordings produced by George Martin
Songs published by Northern Songs
Billboard Hot 100 number-one singles
Cashbox number-one singles
RPM Top Singles number-one singles
Wright Brothers Band songs